Urraca of Zamora (1033/34 – 1101/03) was a Leonese infanta, one of the five children of Ferdinand I the Great, who received the city of Zamora as her inheritance and exercised palatine authority in it. Her story was romanticized in the cantar de gesta called the Cantar de Mio Cid, and Robert Southey's Chronicle of the Cid.

Succession dispute

Before his death in 1065, Ferdinand divided his widespread conquests in central Spain between his five children, charging them to live at peace with one another. Ferdinand's oldest son, Sancho II, received Castile and the tribute from Zaragoza; Alfonso VI received León and the tribute from Toledo; and García II received Galicia. His daughters, Elvira and Urraca, received Toro and Zamora respectively.

Sancho, however, resolved to rule over his father's entire kingdom and made war on his siblings. By 1072, Sancho had overthrown his youngest brother Garcia, and forced his other brother Alfonso to flee to his Moorish vassal city of Toledo. Toro, the city of Sancho's sister Elvira, fell easily. But in a siege of Urraca's better-defended city of Zamora, King Sancho was stalled, and was then mysteriously assassinated on 7 October 1072. It was widely suspected that the assassination was a result of a pact between Alfonso and Urraca. The Chronicle of the Cid, purportedly written by one of the Cid's followers, states that the assassin was a nobleman of Zamora, who then received sanctuary in the city. The chronicle is careful not to place any direct blame on Alfonso or Urraca, just as it takes pains to stress that the participation of the Cid at the siege of Zamora was involuntary and supposedly forced on him by King Sancho.

Alfonso's reign
The Castilian nobility, highly suspicious of both Urraca and Alfonso, maintained the siege of Zamora for a period after Sancho's death. In the absence of Sancho, however, their siege was pointless. According to the chronicle, the guilt of Zamora was decided by a trial by combat, which proved inconclusive. Urraca sent summons to the nobles of Sancho's dominions, and Alfonso was grudgingly acknowledged as heir to both Castile and León. Suspicion, however, remained and, led by the Cid  and a dozen "oath-helpers", the nobles forced Alfonso to swear to his innocence publicly in front of St. Gadea's Church in Burgos. From this incident dated Alfonso's later antagonism to the Cid.

Death 
In her later years, Urraca gradually gave up her governing duties, finally retiring to a monastery in Leon, where she supposedly died in 1101. However, a document from 1103 where she made a donation was retrieved, so the Infanta might died few months or years later.

She is interred in the Chapel of the Kings at the Basílica of San Isidoro of León, along with her siblings Elvira and García.

The following epitaph in Latin was carved in her tombstone:

Literature and film

In the poetic legend, Dona Urraca is the wronged infanta, watching Sancho and the Cid despoil her lands from the battlements of her castle shortly before Sancho is murdered. Her brother Alfonso is her loyal and chivalrous defender.

The 1961 Hollywood film El Cid largely follows the narrative of the Chronicle and the poetic epics, adding to the character of the Infanta a spurned woman role scheming against the Cid, once she seems rejected by him; however it omits the story that Urraca and Rodrigo grew up as close companions in Zamora and there may be other omissions. And it stretches the psychological card that as the older and provoking sister she plays off her brothers Alfonso and Sancho's quarrels for her city and herself [it intimates the incestuous rumours that existed about her and Alfonso, though subtly, as befits a '60's film]. Later in the film, after the death of the haughty older brother Sancho, she focuses her favours to extract from Alfonso compensation for her own grudges with Ruy Diaz. For some reason the film wrongly makes Urraca the ruler of Calahorra, rather than Zamora.  Urraca is portrayed by the French actress Geneviève Page.

References
Del Arco y Garay, Ricardo. Instituto Jerónimo Zurita. Consejo Superior de Investigaciones Científicas.. ed. Sepulcros de la Casa Real de Castilla. Madrid. OCLC 11366237.
Blanco Lozano, Pilar. Colección diplomática de Fernando I (1037–1065). León: Centro de Estudios e Investigación «San Isidoro» (CSIC-CECEL) y Archivo Histórico Diocesano, 1987. .
Martínez Díez, Gonzalo. El Condado de Castilla (711–1065). La Historia frente a la leyenda. Valladolid, Junta de Castilla y León, 2004. .
Sánchez Candeira, Alfonso. Castilla y León en el siglo XI. Estudio del reinado de Fernando I. Madrid: Real Academia de la Historia, 1999. 349 p. .
Viñayo González, Antonio. Fernando I, el Magno (1035–1065). Burgos: La Olmeda, 1999. 309 p. .

External links
Southey's translation of the Chronicle of The Cid

1030s births
1101 deaths
11th-century women rulers
12th-century women rulers
11th-century people from the Kingdom of León
11th-century Spanish women
12th-century nobility from León and Castile
Burials in the Royal Pantheon at the Basilica of San Isidoro
Leonese infantas
El Cid
Women in medieval European warfare
Women in war in Spain
Women in 11th-century warfare
Daughters of kings